is a Japanese actor and singer. He made his first acting appearance in 2003 and has since been involved in many productions, mostly in theater. He is best known for his role as Kuranosuke Shiraishi in Musical: The Prince of Tennis.

In addition to acting, Sasaki debuted as a singer in 2010 with the extended play Spark. From 2012 to 2013, he was part of the project boy band 3Peace Lovers.

Career
Sasaki began his stage career in 2003, appearing in the stage production of Hidamari no Ki. Between 2003 and 2007, he appeared in many stage plays, musicals, commercials, and movies. He became widely known, mainly through his work as Shiraishi Kuranosoke in The Prince of Tennis musical series in 2008. His popularity increased following this work. In 2009, he frequently appeared in [Tenimyu[, and was also featured in multiple magazines and released a photo-book and idol DVD. In 2010, his appearance as Shiraishi Kuranosuke came to an end with Dream Live 7th.

In 2010, he did a recitation of the stage play Watashi no Atama no Naka no Keshigomu 2nd letter (The eraser in my mind). He also appeared in the movie Kimi e no Melody (Melody for you), co-starring Hisanori Sato, who was a member of Tenimyu's Shitenhouji's cast as well. He released his first mini-album, titled Spark, in November 2010 after announcing his artist debut during the Summer Live tour with Yūta Furukawa (Sasaki and Furukawa also met during Tenimyu). At the end of 2010, Sasaki continued his stage career, appearing in Pride. In 2011, he appeared in multiple stage performances as well as in three movies: Gakudori, Gangster, and Ishi no Furu Oka (The Hill of the Falling Stones), in the latter co-starring as the lead with Yūta Furukawa. A few months later, a pair of DVDs were released featuring Sasaki and Furukawa, covering their journey in Australia. Sasaki also started appearing in the TV series Shinwa Senshi Gigazeus, had multiple live performances, released two maxi-singles, and became the MC of the Nico Nico Live Broadcast titled mmmm☆Ecstasy.

In 2012, he continued his stage career, appearing in Douke no Hitomi, Tumbling vol.3, ～, another run of Watashi no Atama no Naka no Keshigomu, and the fifth anniversary of the One-Heart Music Festival to celebrate the fifth anniversary of Theatre Clear. He also made appearances in the TV series Fallen Angel and Aozora no Tamago (A budding blue sky). Nico live broadcast titled mmmm☆Ecstasy finished. In March, he released his second mini-album NeΦ Vocalism. Around the same time, it was announced that he would form a new group called 3Peace☆Lovers with Hayato Nikaido and ZE:A's Ha Min Woo.

2017-present: Freelance

In October 2017, Sasaki sustained a knee injury during a showing of K: The Stage and later got surgery in 2018. In March 2019, Sasaki left his agency to go freelance. He was cast as Goro Akechi for Persona 5: The Stage, his first role in two years that featured him singing.

Discography

Compilation albums

Extended plays

Filmography

Films

Television

Anime

Stage 
 Hidamari no Ki (October 2003, Rikkokai Hall)
 OINARI (February 2004, Theater V Akasaka)
 Hotel California (March 2004, Akashi Studio)
 Ribon no Kishi~Washio Koukou Engekibu Funtouki~ (November 2004, Rikkokai Hall)
 Lost Seven (March 2005, Rikkokai Hall)
 Musical- Silver (October 2005, Rikkokai Hall)
 Oinari (February 2006, Rikkokai Hall)
 Ajidoko Honten 「THE☆Seishun」 (March 2006, Akashi Studio): Production and choreography
 Ie wo Deta (2006, Space Kiritomo)
 Zenkoku Koukou Engeki Contest Opening Act 「Natsuyume」 (2007)
 Touhou Gakuen Gejuutsu Tankidaigaku Engeki Senkou Sotsugyou Musical game (February 2008)
 Musical The Prince of Tennis – Role of Kuranosuke Shiraishi (B Cast)
 The Treasure Match Shitenhouji feat. Hyoutei (February 6 – March 31, 2009)
 Dream live 6th (May 2009)
 The Final Match Rikaidai First feat. Shitenhouji (July – October 2009)
 The Final Match Rikaidai Second feat. Rivals (December 2009 – March 2010)
 Dream live 7th (May 2010)
 Recitation 「Watashi no Atama no Naka no Keshigomi 2nd letter」 Saien (September 10, 11 and 16, 2010)
 Pride (12/2010, Clie Theater) – Role of Ikenohata Ranmaru
 CLUB SEVEN 7th stage (April 3–17, 2011)
 Recitation Watashi no Atama no Naka no Keshigomi 3rd letter (May 3, 2011) as Kousuke
 Sabishii no ha Omae dake Janai (June 17–26, 2011) 
 Recitation Watashi no Atama no Naka no Keshigomi (March 2012)
 Douke no Hitomi (April 2012)
 Recitation Watashi no Atama no Naka no Keshigomi in Osaka (July 2012) as Kousuke
 Tumbling vol.3 (August 2012) as Tsukioka Yuuto
 ～ (October 2012) as Dong Hyun
 Theatre Clear fifth Anniversary ONE-HEART MUSICAL FESTIVAL (December 2012)
 Ultra Musical Bakumatsu Rock as Okita Souji
 Kuroshitsuji The Musical [Lycoris that blazes the earth] (September 5 – October 5, 2014) as Viscount of Druitt 
 Club Seven 10th stage! (April 2–27, 2015)
 Musical Hakuouki Reimeiroku as Hijikata Toshizou (May 18 – June 14, 2015)
 Kuroshitsuji The Musical [Lycoris that blazes the earth] 2015 (November 7 – December 6, 2015) as Viscount of Druitt
 Kuroshitsuji The Musical [Lycoris that blazes the earth] 2015 China performances (December 11–27, 2015) as Viscount of Druitt
 Goku (February 16–28, 2016) as Kougaiji
 Stageplay Touken Ranbu: Kyoden Moyuru Honnouji (May 3–20, 2016) as Souza Samonji
 Ultra Musical Bakumatsu Rock: Kurofune Raikou (August 20 – September 9, 2016)
 Stageplay Touken Ranbu: Kyoden Moyuru Honnouji [Reprise] (December 15, 2016 – January 17, 2017) as Souza Samonji
 Musical Hakuoki: Harada Sanosuke-hen (April 14–30) as Kazama Chikage
 Stageplay Tokyou Ghoul 2nd stage (June 29 – July 9, 2017) as Tsukiyama Shuu
 Stageplay B-project on stage [Over The Wave] (July 28 – August 6, 2017 and August 16–17, 2017) as Kitakado Tomohisa
 Stageplay K: Missing Kings (October 19–29, 2017) as Mishakuji Yukari
 Ultra Musical Bakumatsu Rock Live (November–December 2017) as Okita Souji
 Musical Kuroshitsuji: Tango on the Campania (December 2017 – February 2018) as Viscount of Druitt 
 Musical Onmyoji: Heian Emaki [Japan preview performance] (March 9 -18, 2018) as Kuro Seimei
 Persona 5: The Stage as Goro Akechi

DVD 
 JOURNEY (released March 18, 2009)
 DO the movie (released 5/2010)
 Kimi E no Merodi Maikingu Shun no Kodou Beat of Sasaki Yoshihide (released 10/2010)
 Bokutachi no Chikyuu Road in Australia (released 05/2010)

Game 
 Sengoku Night Blood (2017) – Ishida Mitsunari

References

External links 
 YouTube channel
 

1987 births
Living people
Japanese male actors
People from Tokyo